Nancy DiNardo (born 1949/1950) is an American politician and owner of commercial real estate in Connecticut. She is the current Chairwoman of the Democratic Party of Connecticut and is first woman to hold that position.  She previously served in that position from 2005 until 2015. In the intervening five years, she served as Vice Chairwoman.

Career 
DiNardo served as the chairperson of the party's Trumbull CT Town Committee for nearly 20 years. DiNardo was employed as an educator in the Bridgeport, CT school system for 30 years.

DiNardo has worked for Trumbull's board of health, finance, and police commission. She was treasurer of Bridgeport Mayor Joseph Ganim's 1994 gubernatorial campaign.

References

|-

1949 births
American educators
Connecticut Democrats
Fairfield University alumni
Emmanuel College (Massachusetts) alumni
Living people
People from Trumbull, Connecticut
Politicians from Bridgeport, Connecticut
State political party chairs of Connecticut
Women in Connecticut politics
21st-century American women